Sandra Cristina Castro Silva (born 17 January 1975) is a Portuguese former footballer who played as a midfielder. She has been a member of the Portugal women's national team.

International goals
Scores and results list Portugal's goal tally first

References

1975 births
Living people
Portuguese women's footballers
Women's association football midfielders
Portugal women's international footballers
Boavista F.C. (women) players